Asvestades is a village in the municipality of Didymoteicho in the northern part of the Evros regional unit in Greece. It is 14 km west of the centre of Didymoteicho, in the hills south of the river Erythropotamos. It was known as "Kireççiler" during Ottoman rule. It was annexed to Greece in 1920. The nearest larger village is Kyani to its northeast.

Population

See also
List of settlements in the Evros regional unit

References

External links
Asvestades at the GTP Travel Pages

Didymoteicho
Populated places in Evros (regional unit)